Alcoholic Beverage Control may refer to:
State monopoly or regulation of alcohol beverages in alcoholic beverage control states
California Department of Alcoholic Beverage Control
New Jersey Division of Alcoholic Beverage Control
 North Carolina Alcoholic Beverage Control Commission
 Utah Department of Alcoholic Beverage Control
 Virginia Department of Alcoholic Beverage Control
 Kentucky Office of Alcoholic Beverage Control